Samuel Cruz (18 December 1943 – April 1975) was a Puerto Rican athlete. He competed in the men's long jump at the 1964 Summer Olympics.

References

1943 births
1975 deaths
Athletes (track and field) at the 1964 Summer Olympics
Puerto Rican male long jumpers
Olympic track and field athletes of Puerto Rico
Place of birth missing